Dillon's Dead-Heat Breakers is a video game developed by Vanpool and published by Nintendo for the Nintendo 3DS. It was released in Japan in April 2018, with English releases in North America, Europe, and Australia the following month, with the North American version being limited as digital-only. A sequel to Dillon's Rolling Western, it takes place in a post-apocalyptic world and features Dillon, an anthropomorphic armadillo who must defend frontier villages from walking rock-like monsters. The player is included in the game's cast as their Mii avatar in the form of an "Amiimal" with added animal features from various species. It received mixed reviews from critics, who most greatly criticized its repetitiveness.

Plot 
The game has a darker setting compared to its predecessors, changing its world to be post-apocalyptic. From their home base in The City, Dillon and a band of mercenaries help defend smaller towns and other locations from the Grock invasion.

Gameplay 
The game is a combination of tower defense and action elements. The player must defend against walking rock monsters called Grocks. Mercenaries and the player's avatar use guns to fight the monsters from towers while the player controls Dillon and dashes around the map to fight the monsters one on one.

The Grocks have several stages in their invasion process - once they finish attacking on land, their mothership transforms them into vehicles that race around the roadways of the map. In the third phase, the Grocks become superpowered and charge directly at the base.

Development 
The game's setting was changed away from Western-themed to post-apocalyptic because it was seen as more of a familiar setting to modern audiences. Its producer, Kensuke Tanabe, said it drew inspiration from Mad Max and was originally only going to be a racing game, but the old gameplay was later combined with the new.

Reception 
Dillon's Dead-Heat Breakers received an aggregate score of 69/100 on Metacritic. Neal Ronaghan of Nintendo World Report rated the game 8.5/10, saying that while the game was greatly improved from its predecessors, its pace was overly slow. CJ Andriessen of Destructoid rated it 75/100, calling it a "solid adventure through and through", but criticizing the existence of a game-breaking bug on release. He also stated that the process of mission preparation was "arduous" and the game's economy "baffling". Daniel Starkey of GameSpot rated the game 6/10, saying that while it was "action-packed", the controls were "perplexing" and the combat and day-night cycle were repetitive. He stated that "it's a competent and fun little outing that's almost perfectly suited for kids".

Notes

References 

Nintendo 3DS-only games
Nintendo 3DS games
Nintendo 3DS eShop games
Nintendo games
2018 video games
Post-apocalyptic video games
Action video games
Single-player video games
Video games developed in Japan
Video games produced by Kensuke Tanabe
Vanpool games